Victoria Tower is a Grade II listed Gothic Revival clock tower located alongside Salisbury Dock in Liverpool, England. Positioned among the two river entrance gates to the Salisbury Dock itself, the tower acted as an aid to ships by providing both an accurate time and also warning of impending meteorological changes.

History
Victoria Tower was designed by Jesse Hartley and was constructed between 1847 and 1848, to commemorate the opening of Salisbury Dock. Its design was based upon an earlier drawing by Philip Hardwick in 1846.

Victoria Tower, which was often referred to as the 'docker's clock', was built as an aid to ships in the port, as it allowed them to set the correct time as they sailed out into the Irish Sea, while its bell warned of impending meteorological changes such as high tide and fog. Upon its completion is also served as a flat for the Pier Master.

In 1975, the building was added to the Statutory List of Buildings of Special Architectural or Historic Interest with Grade II status.

Victoria Tower today
Due to the decline in docking within Liverpool, the tower has fallen into a state of disrepair suffering significant decay due to both water and wind damage. The tower is also overgrown with vegetation and has a leaking roof. Nonetheless, despite being in a state of dereliction, Victoria Tower is part of the Stanley Dock Conservation Area and also Liverpool's World Heritage Maritime Mercantile City.

In April 2010, it was announced that Victoria Tower, along with several other buildings around Clarence and Salisbury docks, would be repaired by owners, Peel Holdings. The tower and the areas around it are also included in the proposed £5.5bn regeneration programme, Liverpool Waters.

Design
Hartley's inspiration for the tower's design was the castle architecture of the Rhine region in Central Europe and is clearly visible in the numerous embrasures that are cut into the tower walls. It was constructed from 'irregular shaped' blocks of grey granite, a building material that was used in many of Hartley's other construction projects. The tower can be roughly split into three portions:

The tapered circular base, which has several arched alcoves
The central hexagonal column onto which the tower's six clocks are attached
The roof, which consists of an overhanging 'castellated parapet' that is supported by several corbels

References

Grade II listed buildings in Liverpool
Gothic Revival architecture in Merseyside
Clock towers in the United Kingdom
Liverpool docks
Individual clocks in England
Towers completed in 1848